Tom Sykora (born August 6, 1946) is a Wisconsin legislator and business owner.

Born in Chippewa Falls, Wisconsin, Sykora is a business owner and Vietnam War veteran.
Sykora was elected to the Wisconsin State Assembly in 1994. Sykora served in the Wisconsin State Assembly from 1995 until his retirement in 2003. He attended the University of Wisconsin-River Falls and the University of Wisconsin-Eau Claire.

Notes

Politicians from Chippewa Falls, Wisconsin
Members of the Wisconsin State Assembly
1946 births
Living people
University of Wisconsin–Eau Claire alumni
University of Wisconsin–River Falls alumni